Pawłówek may refer to the following places:
Pawłówek, Kuyavian-Pomeranian Voivodeship (north-central Poland)
Pawłówek, Łódź Voivodeship (central Poland)
Pawłówek, Lublin Voivodeship (east Poland)
Pawłówek, Pułtusk County in Masovian Voivodeship (east-central Poland)
Pawłówek, Sochaczew County in Masovian Voivodeship (east-central Poland)
Pawłówek, Kalisz County in Greater Poland Voivodeship (west-central Poland)
Pawłówek, Nowy Tomyśl County in Greater Poland Voivodeship (west-central Poland)
Pawłówek, Ostrów Wielkopolski County in Greater Poland Voivodeship (west-central Poland)